The 1869 Grand National was the 31st renewal of the Grand National horse race that took place at Aintree near Liverpool, England, on 3 March 1869.

Finishing Order

Non-finishers

References

 1869
Grand National
Grand National
19th century in Lancashire
March 1869 sports events